Aleksandr Nikolayevich Martynov (1892–1956) was an association football player.

International career
Martynov made his debut for Russia on July 5, 1914, in a friendly against Sweden.

External links
  Profile

1892 births
1956 deaths
Russian footballers
Russia international footballers
Association football goalkeepers